The 2023 Epson Tour is a series of professional women's golf tournaments held from March through October 2023 in the United States. The Epson Tour is the second-tier women's professional golf tour in the United States and is the "official developmental tour" of the LPGA Tour. It was most recently known as the Symetra Tour.

Changes for 2023
The number of tournaments were expanded from 21 to 22. Inaugural events are Hartford HealthCare Women's Championship and Black Desert Resort Championship, while the Ann Arbor's Road to the LPGA was removed from the schedule after only one installment. 

The Carolina Golf Classic in North Carolina changed name to Champions Fore Change Invitational.

Schedule and results
The number in parentheses after winners' names show the player's total number of official money, individual event wins on the Epson Tour including that event.

Source:

Leading money winners
The top ten money winners at the end of the season gained fully exempt cards on the LPGA Tour for the 2024 season.

References

External links

Symetra Tour
Epson Tour